A  7.9 earthquake struck offshore between Mindanao and Sulawesi on 14 March 1913. It had a maximum Modified Mercalli intensity of IX (Violent). A majority of the 138 fatalities occurred on Sangihe Island attributed to a mudflow.

Earthquake
The  7.9 mainshock was preceded by foreshocks. The mainshock had a maximum Modified Mercalli intensity (MMI) of IX (Violent) in Davao and Sarangani. MMI VIII (Severe) was observed in Talacogon; MMI VII (Very strong) was observed in Cotabato, Baganga, Butuan, Cabadbaran and Tandag.

Damage and casualties

Indonesia
On Sangihe Island, seismic shaking lasted 4 ± 2 minutes and there was an intense rumble. People were thrown to the ground. There were 20 deaths. Homes located on the swamp were raised from the ground and sank on their sides or collapsed. Many buildings collapsed in Enemawira, Peta and Tabukan. Schools, homes and businessed collapsed in Tamako. At Manganitu and Kendahe, severe damage occurred. Collapses and rock falls was widespread along the rocky coastline. Widespread fractures appeared in the ground, some ejected water. Subsidence occurred in the Menalu area; the sea inundated parts of the plain and remaining residents relocated. Coastal subsidence also occurred at Peta Bay, Tamako and Tabukan.

At Menalu Bay,  of material fell into the water from  height. West of that, a mudflow traveled  down from Endongo Hill, burying 117 villagers and 29 houses. The mudflow buried the area under  of material. The mudflow dammed a river and overflowed. In Manganitu, bridges were washed away.

On Siau Island, one person died and there were injuries. Ground fractures, avalanches and rockfalls occurred but there was no coastal subsidence. People were also unable to stand during shaking. Many brick buildings were ruined and some huts sank to one side. Similar environmental effects and damage occurred in the Talaud Islands but there were no casualties.

Philippines
Shaking lasted half a minute on the Sarangani Islands and many trees toppled. At Davao, strong oscillations were recorded for two to five minutes. Huts made from palm leaves sank on their side and some stone walls collapsed. People in the city were also thrown to the ground. Cracks opened in the ground ejecting sand and water. Along the Agusan River, the water moved in an east–west direction, tossing boats. Shaking was also felt in Baganga, Talakogon, Kotabato, and Butuan. It was also felt in Bohol, Cebu and Leyte; no shaking was felt at Negros and Panay.

Volcanic eruption
The Straits Times and Malay Mail reported a volcanic eruption at Mount Awu. It occurred at the same time as the mudflow at Endongo Hill. The eruption measured 2 on the Volcanic explosivity index.

See also
List of earthquakes in 1913
List of earthquakes in the Philippines

References

External links

Earthquakes in the Philippines
1913 earthquakes
History of Sarangani
Megathrust earthquakes in the Philippines
Megathrust earthquakes in Indonesia